Broadway's Closer to Sunset Blvd is the 1984 debut album of Isley-Jasper-Isley on CBS/Magic Sound Records. Marvin Isley announced the record as a separate project from the Isley Brothers rather than a permanent break up. "Look the Other Way" reached number 14 on the R&B chart, "Kiss and Tell,"  went to number 52.

Track listing
Information is based on the album's liner notes

Sex Drive (5:28) Background Vocals: Audrey Wheeler & Sandy Barber
Serve You Right (5:07)
I Can't Get Over Losin' You (4:05) Background Vocals: Audrey Wheeler & Sandy BarberCongas: Mr. Kevin Jones
Kiss and Tell (5:28)
Love Is Gonna Last Forever (4:28)
Broadway Closer to Sunset Blvd. (3:33)
Look the Other Way (5:06)
Break This Chain (4:30) Congas: Mr. Kevin Jones

Notes
All Tracks written, produced & arranged by Isley-Jasper-Isley
Additional Background Vocals performed by Isley-Jasper-Isley

Personnel 
Marvin Isley - Lead vocals, electric bass, bass synth, other percussion
Chris Jasper - Lead vocals, rap vocals, electric Grand piano, keyboards, additional synthesizers, other percussion
Ernie Isley - Lead vocals, 12-string acoustic guitar, 12-string electric guitar, drums, timbales, other percussion
Kenneth Lonas - Assistant engineer
Mark McKenna - Recording engineer, remixing

References

Isley-Jasper-Isley albums
1984 debut albums